Habenaria mossii is a species of plant in the family Orchidaceae. It is endemic to South Africa.  Its natural habitat is temperate grassland. It is threatened by habitat loss.

References

Endemic orchids of South Africa
mossii
Endangered plants
Taxonomy articles created by Polbot